The Norwegian Challenge was a golf tournament on the Challenge Tour, played in Norway. It was founded in 1994 and was the leading men's tournament in Norway, which does not host a European Tour event.

Winners

Notes

External links
Coverage on the Challenge Tour's official site

Former Challenge Tour events
Golf tournaments in Norway
Lexus
Summer events in Norway